
Warawara (Aymara warawara star, hispanicized spellings Huara Huara, Huarahuara),  often spelled Wara Wara, is a small lake in Bolivia in the Potosí Department, Antonio Quijarro Province, Porco Municipality, Kunturiri Canton. It is 0.77 km long and 0.65 km at its widest point.

References 

Lakes of Potosí Department